In the branch of mathematics known as Euclidean geometry, the Poncelet–Steiner theorem is one of several results concerning compass and straightedge constructions having additional restrictions imposed on the traditional rules. This result states that whatever can be constructed by straightedge and compass together can be constructed by straightedge alone, provided that a single circle and its centre are given. This theorem is related to the rusty compass equivalence.

 Any Euclidean construction, insofar as the given and required elements are points (or lines), if it can be completed with both the compass and the straightedge together, may be completed with the straightedge alone provided that no fewer than one circle with its center exist in the plane.

Though a compass can make constructions significantly easier, it is implied that there is no functional purpose of the compass once the first circle has been drawn. All constructions remain possible, though it is naturally understood that circles and their arcs cannot be drawn without the compass. This means only that the compass may be used for aesthetic purposes, rather than for the purposes of construction. All points that uniquely define a construction, which can be determined with the use of the compass, are equally determinable without.

Constructions carried out in adherence with this theorem - relying solely on the use of a straightedge tool without the aid of a compass - are known as Steiner constructions. Steiner constructions may involve any number of circles, including none, already drawn in the plane, with or without their centers.

History 

In the tenth century, the Persian mathematician Abu al-Wafa' Buzjani (940−998) considered geometric constructions using a straightedge and a compass with a fixed opening, a so-called rusty compass. Constructions of this type appeared to have some practical significance as they were used by artists Leonardo da Vinci and Albrecht Dürer in Europe in the late fifteenth century. A new viewpoint developed in the mid sixteenth century when the size of the opening was considered fixed but arbitrary and the question of how many of Euclid's constructions could be obtained was paramount.

Renaissance mathematician Lodovico Ferrari, a student of Gerolamo Cardano in a "mathematical challenge" against Niccolò Fontana Tartaglia was able to show that "all of Euclid" (that is, the straightedge and compass constructions in the first six books of Euclid's Elements) could be accomplished with a straightedge and rusty compass. Within ten years additional sets of solutions were obtained by Cardano, Tartaglia and Tartaglia's student Benedetti. During the next century these solutions were generally forgotten until, in 1673, Georg Mohr published (anonymously and in Dutch) Euclidis Curiosi containing his own solutions. Mohr had only heard about the existence of the earlier results and this led him to work on the problem.

Showing that "all of Euclid" could be performed with straightedge and rusty compass is not the same as proving that all straightedge and compass constructions could be done with a straightedge and just a rusty compass. Such a proof would require the formalization of what a straightedge and compass could construct. This groundwork was provided by Jean Victor Poncelet in 1822, having been motivated by Mohr's work on the Mohr-Mascheroni theorem. He also conjectured and suggested a possible proof that a straightedge and rusty compass would be equivalent to a straightedge and compass, and moreover, the rusty compass need only be used once. The result that a straightedge and single circle with given centre is equivalent to a straightedge and compass was proved by Jakob Steiner in 1833.

Relationships to other constructs 

Various other notions, tools, terminology, etc., is often associated (sometimes loosely) to the Poncelet-Steiner theorem. Some are listed here.

Rusty compass 
The rusty compass describes a compass whose hinge is so rusted as to be fused such that its legs - the needle and pencil - are unable to adjust width. In essence, it is a compass whose distance is fixed, and which draws circles of a predetermined and constant, but arbitrary radius. Circles may be drawn centered at any arbitrary point, but the radius is unchangeable.

As a restricted construction paradigm, the rusty compass constructions allow the use of a straightedge and the fixed-width compass.

In some sense, the rusty compass is a generalization and simplification of the Poncelet-Steiner theorem. Though not more powerful, it is certainly more convenient. The Poncelet-Steiner theorem requires a single circle with arbitrary radius and center point to be placed in the plane. As it is the only drawn circle, whether or not it was drawn by a rusty compass is immaterial and equivalent. The benefit of general rusty compass constructions, however, is that the compass may be used repeatedly to redraw circles centered at any desired point, albeit with the same radius, thus simplifying many constructions. Naturally if all constructions are possible with a single circle arbitrarily placed in the plane, then the same can surely be said about a straightedge and rusty compass.

It is known that a straightedge and a rusty compass is sufficient to construct all that is possible with straightedge and standard compass - with the implied understanding that circular arcs of arbitrary radii cannot be drawn, and only need be drawn for aesthetic purposes rather than constructive ones.  Historically this was proven when the Poncelet-Steiner theorem was proven, which is a stronger result. The rusty compass, therefore, is no weaker than the Poncelet-Steiner theorem. The rusty compass is also no stronger.

The Poncelet-Steiner theorem reduces Ferrari's rusty compass equivalence, a claim at the time, to a single-use compass: all points necessary to uniquely describe any compass-straightedge construction may be achieved with only a straightedge, once the first circle has been placed.  The Poncelet-Steiner theorem takes the rusty compass scenario, and breaks the compass completely after its first use.

Steiner constructions 
The term Steiner construction typically refers to any geometric construction that utilizes the straightedge tool only, and is sometimes simply called a straightedge-only construction. No stipulations are made about what geometric objects already exist in the plane, and no implications are made about what is or is not possible to construct. Thus, all constructions adhering to the Poncelet-Steiner theorem are Steiner constructions, though not all Steiner constructions adhere to the standard of providing only one circle with its center. The Poncelet-Steiner theorem does not require an actual compass - it is presumed that the circle preexists in the plane - therefore all constructions are Steiner constructions.

Steiner's theorem, a lemma 
If only one circle is to be given and no other special information, Steiner's theorem implies that the center of the circle must be provided along with the circle. This is done by proving the impossibility of constructing the circle's center from straightedge alone using only a single circle in the plane, without its center. An argument using projective transformations and Steiner's conic sections is used.

A naïve summary of the proof is as follows. With the use of a straightedge tool, only linear projective transformations are possible, and linear projective transformations are reversible operations.  Lines project onto lines under any linear projective transformation, while conic sections project onto conic sections under a linear projective transformation, but the latter are skewed such that eccentricities, foci, and centers of circles are not preserved.  Under different mappings the center does not map uniquely and reversibly. This would not be the case if lines could be used to determine a circles center. As linear transformations are reversible operations and would thus produce unique results, the fact that unique results are not possible implies the impossibility of center-point constructions.  The uniqueness of the constructed center would depend on additional information which makes the construction reversible.

Thus it is not possible to construct everything that can be constructed with straightedge and compass with straightedge alone.  Consequently,  requirements on the Poncelet-Steiner theorem cannot be weakened with respect to the circle center. If the centre of the only given circle is not provided, it cannot be obtained by a straightedge alone. Many constructions are impossible with straightedge alone. Something more is necessary, and a circle with its center identified is sufficient.

Alternatively, the center may be omitted with sufficient additional information.  This is not a weakening of the Poncelet-Steiner theorem, merely an alternative framework. Nor is it a contradiction of Steiner's Theorem which hypothesizes only a single circle. The inclusion of this sufficient alternative information disambiguates the mappings under the projective transformations, thus allowing various Steiner constructions to recover the circle center. Some alternatives include two concentric or two intersecting circles, or three circles, or other variations wherein the provided circle(s) are devoid of their centers, but some other unique but sufficient criterion is met. In any of these cases, the center of a circle can be constructed, thereby reducing the problem to the Poncelet-Steiner theorem hypothesis (with the added convenience of having additional circles in the plane).

Constructive proof approach
To prove the theorem, each of the basic constructions of compass and straightedge need to be proven to be possible by using a straightedge alone (provided that a circle and its center exist in the plane), as these are the foundations of, or elementary steps for, all other constructions. That is to say, all constructions can be written as a series of steps involving these five basic constructions:
Creating the line through two existing points
Creating the circle through one point with centre another point
Creating the point which is the intersection of two existing, non-parallel lines
Creating the one or two points in the intersection of a line and a circle (if they intersect)
Creating the one or two points in the intersection of two circles (if they intersect).

#1 - A line through two points

This can be done with a straightedge alone. Neither a compass nor a circle is required.

#2 - A circle through one point with defined center

It is understood that the arc of a circle cannot be drawn without a compass. A circle is considered to be given by any two points, one defining the center and one existing on the circumference at radius. Any such pair define a unique circle. In keeping with the intent of the theorem which we aim to prove, the actual circle need not be drawn but for aesthetic reasons.

#3 – Intersection of two lines

This construction can also be done directly with a straightedge.
 
#4, #5 - The other constructions

Thus, to prove the theorem, only constructions #4 and #5 need be proven possible using only a straightedge and a given circle with its center.

 Notes 

Any doubts about constructions #1 or #3 would apply equally to the traditional construction paradigm involving the compass, and thus are not concerns unique to the Poncelet-Steiner theorem.

Construction #2 should not be of concern.  The arc of the circle is only used in traditional construction paradigms for the purposes of circle-circle and circle-line intersections, thus if constructions #4 and #5 are satisfiable without the arc of the circle, then this will prove non-necessity of drawing the arc. This therefore proves that construction #2 is satisfied by a simple labeling of two points uniquely identifying the circle.

Constructive proof 
In general constructions there are often several variations that will produce the same result. The choices made in such a variant can be made without loss of generality. However, when a construction is being used to prove that something can be done, it is not necessary to describe all these various choices and, for the sake of clarity of exposition, only one variant will be given below. The variants below are chosen for their ubiquity in application rather than simplicity under any particular set of special conditions.

In the constructions below, a circle defined by a center point  and a point on its circumference, through which the arc of the circle passes, is denoted . As most circles are not compass-drawn, center and circumference points are named explicitly, and usually separately. Per the theorem, when a compass-drawn circle is provided it is simply referred to as the given circle or the provided circle.  The provided circle should always be assumed to be placed arbitrarily in the plane with an arbitrary radius (i.e. in general position).

The intersection points between any line and the given circle may be found directly. The Poncelet-Steiner Theorem does not prohibit the normal treatment of circles already drawn in the plane; normal construction rules apply. The theorem only prohibits the construction of new circular arcs with a compass.

Steiner constructions and those constructions herein proving the Poncelet-Steiner theorem require the arbitrary placement of points in space. In some construction paradigms - such as in the geometric definition of the constructible number - this may be prohibited.

Some preliminary constructions 
To prove the above constructions #4 and #5, which are included below, a few necessary intermediary constructions are also explained below since they are used and referenced frequently. These are also straightedge-only constructions. All constructions below rely on basic constructions #1,#2,#3, and any other construction that is listed prior to it.

Parallel of a line having a collinear bisected segment 

This construction does not require the use of the given circle.  Naturally any line that passes through the center of the given circle implicitly has a bisected segment: the diameter is bisected by the center.  The animated gif file embedded at the introduction to this article demonstrates this construction, reiterated here without the circle and with enumerated steps.

 Construct a line  (in red).
 Construct a line  (in orange).
 Define an arbitrary point  on line .
 Construct a line  (in green).
 Construct a line  (in light blue).
 Lines  and  intersect at point .
 Construct a line  (in purple).
 Lines  and  intersect at point .
 Construct a line  (in dark blue), the desired parallel.

In some literature the bisected line segment is sometimes viewed as a one-dimensional "circle" existing on the line. Alternatively, some literature views the bisected line segment as a two dimensional circle in three dimensional space with the line passing through a diameter, but not parallel to the plane, thus intersecting the plane of construction at two points on the circumference with the midpoint simply being the prescribed circle center.

Creating a bisected segment on a line 
If the line passes through the center of a circle, the segment defined by the diameter through the circle is bisected by the center of the circle.  In the general case, however, any other line in the plane may have a bisected segment constructed onto it.  This construction does require the use of the given circle.

 Draw an arbitrary line (in red) passing through the given circles center, and the desired midpoint  (chosen arbitrarily) on the line .
 Notice that the red line, passes through the center of the circle and highlights a diameter, bisected by the circle center. Any parallel may be made from this line according to the previous construction.
 Choose an arbitrary point  on the given circle (which does not lie on the perpendicular of  through the circle center).
 Construct a line (in orange), passing through , that is parallel to the red line .

Constructing a parallel of any line 

This construction does require the use of the given circle. In order to generalize the parallel line construction to all possible lines, not just the ones with a collinear bisected line segment, it becomes necessary to have additional information.  In keeping with the Poncelet-Steiner theorem, a circle (with center) is the object of choice for this construction. 

To construct a parallel line of any given line, through any point in the plane, we trivially combine two constructions:
 Any line from which a parallel is to be made must have a bisected segment constructed onto it, if one does not already exist.
 A parallel is then constructed according to the previous parallel construction involving the collinear bisected segment.

In general, however, a parallel may be constructed from any pair of lines which are already parallel to one another; thus a third parallel may be produced from any two, without the use of a circle. Additionally, a parallel of any line may be constructed whenever there exists in the plane any parallelogram, also without the use of a given circle.

Constructing a perpendicular line 

This construction does require the use of the given circle and takes advantage of Thales's theorem. 

From a given line , and a given point  in the plane, a perpendicular to the line is to be constructed through the point. Provided is the given circle .
 If the desired line from which a perpendicular is to be made, does not pass through the given circle (or it also passes through the given circle's center), then a new parallel line (in red) may be constructed arbitrarily such that it does pass through the given circle but not its center, and the perpendicular is to be made from this line instead.
 Draw a line , through the circle center.
 This line intersects the given circle at point .
 Draw a line .
 Construct a parallel of line  through point  using previous constructions.
 A perpendicular of the original black line, now exists in the plane, and a parallel of it may be constructed through any point in the plane.

An alternative construction allows a perpendicular to be constructed without the given circle, provided there exists in the plane any square.

Constructing the midpoint of any segment 

Given is a line segment , which is to be bisected. Optionally, a parallel line  exists in the plane.

 If the line , which is parallel to line segment , does not exist in the plane then it must be constructed according to earlier constructions using the given circle in the plane (not depicted).
 A given circle in the plane is not required for this construction if the parallel already exists.
 The parallel may be placed in the plane arbitrarily, so long as it is not collinear with the line segment.
 Arbitrarily choose a point  in the plane which is not collinear with the line or the line segment.
 Draw a line  (in red), intersecting line  at point .
 Draw a line  (in orange), intersecting line  at point .
 Draw a line  (in blue), intersecting segment  at point .
 Point  is the desired midpoint of segment .
 Line  also bisects segment 

For added perspective, in some sense this construction is a variant of a previous construction of a parallel from a bisected line segment. It is the same set of lines when taken on whole, but constructed in a different order, and from a different initial set of conditions, arriving at a different end goal.

Constructing the radical axis between circles 

This construction does require the use of the given circle (which is not depicted) for the referenced sub-constructions.

The radical axis, line , between the two circles may be constructed:
 Draw a line  (in orange) through the circle centers.
 Draw a line segment  (in red) between the points on the circumference of the circles.
 Find the midpoint, of segment .
 Lines  and  intersect at point .
An alternative approach is required (see below).
 Construct a line  (in dark blue) perpendicular to line  and passing through point .
 Line  is the desired radical axis.

Resolution of failed construction 
One such alternative is given below with the arbitrarily chosen circle  used for demonstration, along with the provided circle . The circle  of the radical axis construction is not depicted.

To define a circle only the center and one point - any point - on the circumference is required. In principle a new point  is constructed such that circle  is equal to circle , but point  is not equal to point . The construction of the radical axis is begun anew with circle  standing in for circle . In this way the coincidental placement of the midpoint  (now of segment  ) on the line  is avoided. 

One way of going about this which satisfies most conditions is to construct point  diametrically opposite , collinear with a line :
 Draw the line  (in red).
 Construct a parallel (in orange) of line  through the center, point , of the given circle.
 Draw a line  (in green), connecting the center of circle  with the center of the given circle.
 Draw a line  (in pink), connecting the points on the circle circumferences.
 In the general case, points  and  may be switched without loss of generality.
 Lines  and  intersect in a point .
 Draw a line  (in blue).
 Lines  and  intersect at a point .
 Point  is the desired point.

If the final goal is to construct a diametrically opposite point, an alternative approach is required.

If the goal is to resolve the limitation in the radical axis construction, one option is to attempt a similar construction on circle  instead. This too may fail, if all five points are collinear. Alternatively an entirely different point  may be determined, not necessarily a diametrically opposite one, requiring a small variation on the above construction.

Intersecting a line with a circle (Construction #4) 

This construction does require the use of the provided circle, .

Given is the line  (in black) and the circle , which is not compass-constructed.
 Draw a line  (in red) through the points defining the circle.
 Construct a parallel (in orange) of line  through the center  of the provided circle.
 The parallel intersects the provided circle at two points, one of which is arbitrarily chosen: .
 Draw a line  (in light green), through the centers of the two circles (i.e. the one provided by compass construction and the one which is to be intersected).
 Draw a line  (in light blue), connecting the two points on the circumferences of the two circles.
 If point  does not exist due to lines  and  being parallel - which results from circles  and  having equal radii - then refer back to step 2 and choose the alternate point of intersection, .
 Choosing a point  arbitrarily on line , such that it is not on line , draw a line  (in pink).
 For construction simplicity and only if line  is not parallel to line , lines  and  may be coincident.
 Draw a line  (in brown).
 Construct a parallel (in dark purple) of line  through the center  of the provided circle.
 The parallel intersects the line  at a point .
 Construct a parallel (in yellow) of line  through the point .
 If the parallel does not intersect the provided circle then neither does the line  intersect circle .

Intersecting two circles (Construction #5) 
The intersection between two circles becomes a trivial combination of two earlier constructions:
 Construct the radical axis between the two circles.
 Construct the intersection points between the radical axis (which is a line) and either one of the two circles arbitrarily chosen, using basic construction #4. 
 These points are the desired points of intersection of the circles.
 The two circles and the radical axis all intersect at the same loci of points: two points, one point if tangential, or none if they do not intersect.
 If the radical axis does not intersect one circle then it intersects neither, and neither do the two circles intersect.

Conclusion 
The second basic construction - defining a circle with two points - never needed an arc to be constructed with the compass in order for the circle to be utilized in constructions - namely the intersections with circles and with lines which, together, are the essence of all constructions involving a circle. Thus defining a circle by its center and by any arbitrary point on its circumference is sufficient to fully describe the entire circle and construct with it. Basic construction #2 is satisfied.

Since all five basic constructions have been shown to be achievable with only a straightedge, provided that a single circle with its center is placed in the plane, this proves the Poncelet-Steiner theorem.

Other types of restricted construction 
The Poncelet–Steiner theorem can be contrasted with the Mohr–Mascheroni theorem, which states that any compass and straightedge construction can be performed with only a compass.

The rusty compass restriction allows the use of a compass, provided it produces circles of fixed radius. Although the rusty compass constructions were explored since the 10th century, and all of Euclid was shown to be constructable with a rusty compass by the 17th century, the Poncelet-Steiner theorem proves that the rusty compass and straightedge together are more than sufficient for any and all Euclidean construction. Indeed, the rusty compass becomes a tool simplifying constructions over merely the straightedge and single circle. Viewed the other way, the Poncelet-Steiner theorem not only fixes the width of the rusty compass, but ensures that the compass breaks after its first use.

The requirement that one circle with its center provided has been since generalized to include alternative but equally restrictive conditions. In one such alternative, the entire circle is not required at all. In 1904, Francesco Severi proved that any small arc (of the circle), together with the centre, will suffice. This construction breaks the rusty compass at any point before the first circle is completed, but after it has begun, and still all constructions remain possible.  Thus, the conditions hypothesizing the Poncelet-Steiner theorem may indeed be weakened, but only with respect to the completeness of the circular arc, and not, per the Steiner theorem, with respect to the center.

In two other alternatives, the centre may be omitted entirely provided that given are either two concentric circles, or two distinct intersecting circles, of which there are two cases: two intersection points and one intersection point (tangential circles). From any of these scenarios, centres can be constructed, reducing the scenario to the original hypothesis.

Still other variations exist. It suffices to have two non-intersecting circles (without their centres), provided that at least one point is given on either the centerline or on the radical axis of the two circles, or alternatively to have three non-intersecting circles. Once a single center is constructed, the scenario again reduces to the original hypothesis of the Poncelet-Steiner theorem.

Liberated, or neusis, constructions 
Instead of restricting the rules of construction, it is of equal interest to study alleviating the rules.  Just as geometers have studied what remains possible to construct (and how) when additional restrictions are placed on traditional construction rules - such as compass only, straightedge only, rusty compass, etc. - they have also studied what constructions becomes possible that weren't already when the natural restrictions inherent to traditional construction rules are alleviated. Questions such as "what becomes constructible", "how might it be constructed", "what are the fewest traditional rules to be broken", "what are the simplest tools needed", "which seemingly different tools are equivalent", etc. are asked. 

The arbitrary angle is not trisectable using traditional compass and straightedge rules, for example, but the trisection becomes constructible when allowed the additional tool of an ellipse in the plane.  Some of the traditional problems such as angle trisection, doubling the cube, squaring the circle, finding cubic roots, etc., have been resolvable using an expanded set of tools.  In general, the objects studied to expand the scope of what is constructible have included:
 Non-constructible "auxiliary" curves in the plane - including any of the conic sections, cycloids, lemniscates, limaçons, the Archimedean spiral, any of the trisectrices or quadratrices, and others.
 Physical tools other than the compass and straightedge - generally called neuseis - which include specific tools such as the Tomahawk, markable straightedges and graduated rulers, right triangular rulers, linkages, ellipsographs, and others.
 Origami, or paper-folding techniques.

The ancient geometers considered the conic sections, and regarded their use as a less pure form of construction, but more pure than the use of neuseis (alternative physical tools) or other unusual curves.  The term neusis or neusis construction may also refer to a specific tool or method employed by the ancient geometers.

Approximations 
Although not a true and rigorous construction (nor considered a neusis construction by normal definitions), it is possible to approximate a construction to a predetermined level of precision using only compass and straightedge, using a reiterative approach.  Although each point, line or circle is a valid construction, what it aims to approximate can never truly be achieved. Indeed, using a compass and straightedge alone, if an infinite number of constructive steps are allowed, many more points beyond what is normally constructible become possible, as a convergent process and limiting behavior. For example, an angle trisection may be performed exactly using an infinite sequence of angle bisections. If terminated at some finite point, an accurate approximation of a trisection can be achieved. In traditional construction rules, this is not allowed: a construction must terminate in a finite number of applications of the compass and straightedge, and must produce the desired construction exactly.

See also 
Steel square
Constructible polygon
Projective geometry
Inversive geometry
Geometrography

Notes

References

Further reading

External links
 Jacob Steiner's theorem at cut-the-knot (It is impossible to find the center of a given circle with the straightedge alone)
 Straightedge alone Basic constructions of straightedge-only constructions.
 Two circles and only a straightedge, an article by Arseniy Akopyan and Roman Fedorov.
 A remark on the construction of the centre of a circle by means of the ruler, by Christian Gram.
 Poncelet-Steiner Theorem, a page primarily about Steiner's Theorem
 Poncelet-Steiner Theorem

Euclidean plane geometry
Theorems in plane geometry
Compass and straightedge constructions